This is a list of the players who played for Germany national football team and who were born outside the current borders of Germany. This list includes former West Germany national football team players. It also includes players born in presently non-German territories even if they were controlled by Germany when they were born regardless of the means by which those lands had come under German administration - this list therefore includes players born in the historical eastern territories of Germany, militarily-occupied territories, territories annexed by the Nazis and German overseas colonies. However, it does not include players who played only for the former East Germany or Saarland national football teams, nor does it include any Germany/West Germany international footballers born in East Germany, Saarland or West Berlin prior to those lands' absorption by the modern Federal Republic of Germany.

List of Germany international footballers born outside Germany

Austria 
 Franz Binder
 Karl Decker
 Wilhelm Hahnemann
 Franz Jelinek
 Matthias Kaburek
 Alexander Martinek
 Hans Mock
 Josef Pekarek
 Hans Pesser
 Peter Platzer
 Rudolf Raftl
 Willibald Schmaus
 Karl Sesta
 Josef Stroh
 Johann Urbanek
 Franz Wagner

Belgium 
 Herbert Wimmer

Bosnia and Herzegovina

SFR Yugoslavia 
 Marko Marin

Brazil 
 Cacau
 Kevin Kuranyi
 Paulo Rink

Cameroon 

 Youssoufa Moukoko

Czech Republic

Czechoslovakia 
 Mirko Votava

Sudetenland 
 Sigfried Held

France 
 Armel Bella-Kotchap

Ghana 
 Gerald Asamoah

Hungary 
 Ernst Nagelschmitz
 Stefan Reisch

Namibia

German South West Africa 
 Werner Schulz

Poland 
 Paul Freier
 Richard Herrmann
 Miroslav Klose
 Dariusz Wosz
 Martin Max
 Dieter Mietz
 Werner Olk
 Sepp Piontek
 Lukas Podolski
 Reinhard Schaletzki
 Lukas Sinkiewicz
 Hans Sturm
 Piotr Trochowski
 Wolfgang Weber
 Ernst Wilimowski

Romania 
 Josef Posipal

Russia

East Prussia 
 Klaus-Dieter Sieloff

Soviet Union 
 Andreas Beck

Spain
 Anthony Jung

Slovakia

Czechoslovakia 
 Fritz Balogh

Slovenia

SFR Yugoslavia 
 Fredi Bobic

Switzerland 
 Oliver Neuville

Syria 
 Mahmoud Dahoud

Turkey 
 Mustafa Doğan

Ukraine

Soviet Union 
 Roman Neustädter

List by country of birth

Notes 

Lists of Germany international footballers
Germany
Lists of German football transfers
Immigration to Germany
Association football player non-biographical articles